The Conspicuous Leadership Star, post-nominal letters CLS, was instituted by the President of the Republic of South Africa in April 1996. It was awarded to veteran cadres of Umkhonto we Sizwe, the military wing of the African National Congress, who have distinguished themselves during the "struggle" by distinguished conduct and exceptional combat leadership.

Umkhonto we Sizwe
Umkhonto we Sizwe, abbreviated as MK, Zulu for "Spear of the Nation", was the para-military wing of the African National Congress (ANC). It was established on 16 December 1961 to wage an armed "struggle" against the Nationalist government inside South Africa. On 27 April 1994, Umkhonto we Sizwe was amalgamated with six other military forces into the South African National Defence Force (SANDF).

Institution
The Conspicuous Leadership Star, post-nominal letters CLS, was instituted by the President of South Africa in April 1996. It is the junior award of a set of three decorations for bravery, along with the Star for Bravery in Gold and the Star for Bravery in Silver.

Umkhonto we Sizwe's military decorations and medals were modeled on those of the South African Defence Force and these three decorations are the approximate equivalents of, respectively, the Honoris Crux Gold, the Honoris Crux (1975) and the Pro Virtute Decoration.

Award criteria
The decoration could be awarded to veteran cadres of Umkhonto we Sizwe who have distinguished themselves during the "struggle" by distinguished conduct and exceptional combat leadership.

Order of wear

The position of the Conspicuous Leadership Star in the official military and national orders of precedence was revised upon the institution of a new set of honours on 27 April 2003, but it remained unchanged.

Umkhonto we Sizwe
  
Official MK order of precedence:
 Preceded by the Star for Bravery in Silver (SBS).
 Succeeded by the Decoration for Merit in Gold (DMG).

South African National Defence Force until 26 April 2003
  
Official SANDF order of precedence:
 Preceded by the Pro Merito Decoration (PMD) of the Republic of South Africa.
 Succeeded by the Star for Conspicuous Leadership (SCL) of the Azanian People's Liberation Army.
Official national order of precedence:
 Preceded by the Pro Merito Decoration (PMD) of the Republic of South Africa.
 Succeeded by the Star for Conspicuous Leadership (SCL) of the Azanian People's Liberation Army.

Description
Obverse
The Conspicuous Leadership Star is a five-pointed star, struck in bronze, to fit inside a circle with a diameter of 38 millimetres, displaying a bronze lion on a ruby red enameled centre roundel.

Ribbon
The ribbon is 32 millimetres wide and red, with two 6 millimetres wide brown bands in the centre, spaced 4 millimetres apart.

Discontinuation
Conferment of the Conspicuous Leadership Star was discontinued upon the institution of a new set of honours on 27 April 2003.

References

Military decorations and medals of uMkhonto we Sizwe
1996 establishments in South Africa
Awards established in 1996